Bryan Washington (born October 1993) is an American writer. He published his debut short story collection, Lot, in 2019 and a novel, Memorial, in 2020.

Early life and education
Washington was born October 1993 in Kentucky and moved to Katy, Texas when he was 3 years old. He knew he was gay at a young age but did not formally come out, fearing stigmatization. He graduated from James E. Taylor High School in 2011. Washington graduated from the University of Houston with a BA in English, and continued his education at the University of New Orleans where he graduated with an MFA.

Career
Lot, a series of interconnected short stories set in Houston, was published in 2019 by Riverhead. The book centers in part on Nicolás, a young man of mixed African American and Latino American descent who works in his family's restaurant while coming to terms with his sexuality. The book was the winner of the 2019 Ernest J. Gaines Award for Literary Excellence, the 2020 Dylan Thomas Prize, and the 2020 Lambda Literary Award for Gay Fiction.

Washington's debut novel, Memorial, was published on October 27, 2020. Prior to publication, A24 purchased the rights to adapt the novel for television, with Washington adapting his novel.

Washington lectures in English at Rice University, where in July 2020 he was made George Guion Williams Writer in Residence and Scholar in Residence for Racial Justice.

Bibliography

Books 
 
 
 Family Meal: A Novel. Riverhead Books. 2023

Fiction and essays

References

External links

Living people
1993 births
21st-century American short story writers
21st-century American male writers
21st-century American novelists
African-American short story writers
African-American novelists
American male novelists
American male short story writers
American gay writers
Lambda Literary Award for Gay Fiction winners
LGBT African Americans
American LGBT novelists
Writers from Houston
People from Katy, Texas
LGBT people from Kentucky
LGBT people from Texas
University of Houston alumni
University of New Orleans alumni
21st-century African-American writers
21st-century American LGBT people
African-American male writers